Lisa Robinson is an American journalist and writer.  She was born and raised on the Upper West Side of Manhattan and attended The Bronx High School of Science and Syracuse University.  She was married to the late  music producer and radio host Richard Robinson. She is the author of “Nobody Ever Asked Me About the Girls”, a discussion of the rock and roll women she interviewed, a memoir There Goes Gravity: A Life in Rock and Roll about her life as a music journalist.  She also wrote the novel Walk on Glass.  She is a contributing editor for Vanity Fair and is the former editor of Rock Scene. She has also written music criticism for the New York Post.

Journalism 
She began her journalism career, in 1969, at the suggestion of her husband who asked her to take over a column he wrote for a British paper.  Robinson went on to write for a variety of publications, including Creem, Rock Video, the New York Post, and the New Musical Express.  She covered various popular artists and bands, including The Rolling Stones, Led Zeppelin, John Lennon, Queen, Michael Jackson, Duran Duran, U2, David Bowie, Chrissie Hynde, The Clash, The Who, and Patti Smith. She conducted a rare televised interview with Freddie Mercury in 1984.

She frequently covered acts playing at CBGB in the 1970s.  While she toured with The Rolling Stones in 1975 she also acted as their press liaison.

Works 
 Walk on Glass (1982). 
 There Goes Gravity: A Life in Rock and Roll (2014). 
 Nobody Ever Asked Me about the Girls: Women, Music and Fame (2020).

References 

Year of birth missing (living people)
Living people
20th-century American non-fiction writers
21st-century American non-fiction writers
 American music journalists
American women journalists
People from Manhattan
 The Bronx High School of Science alumni
 Syracuse University alumni
21st-century American women writers
20th-century American women writers
Vanity Fair (magazine) people